Ribosomal protein S6 kinase beta-2 is an enzyme that in humans is encoded by the RPS6KB2 gene.

This gene encodes a member of the RSK (ribosomal S6 kinase) family of serine/threonine kinases. This kinase contains two nonidentical kinase catalytic domains and phosphorylates the S6 ribosomal protein and eucaryotic translation initiation factor 4B (eIF4B). Phosphorylation of S6 leads to an increase in protein synthesis and cell proliferation.

References

Further reading

EC 2.7.11